Leping is a county-level city in the northeast of Jiangxi province, China. It is under the administration of the prefecture-level city of Jingdezhen.

Administrative divisions
Leping City has 2 subdistricts, 14 towns and 2 townships.
2 subdistricts
 Jiyang
 Tashan

14 towns

2 townships
 Luci
 Shiligang

Transportation

Rail
Leping is served by the Anhui–Jiangxi Railway.

Climate

References

Administrative subdivisions of Jiangxi